There are multiple media outlets which focus primarily on television soap operas and telenovelas. These publications and websites feature news, cast and crew interviews, plot summaries and previews, editorials and reviews, TV listings and video previews related to the genre.

References

English-language mass media
Lists of websites
 
Review websites
Soap opera lists